Showt (also Romanized as Showţ; also known as Shoţ) is a city in the Central District of Showt County, West Azerbaijan province, Iran, and serves as capital of the county. At the 2006 census, its population was 19,759 in 4,654 households when it was in the former Showt District of Maku County). The following census in 2011 counted 21,047 people in 5,491 households, by which time the district had been separated from the county, Showt County established, and divided into two districts: the Central District and Qarah Quyun Districts. The latest census in 2016 showed a population of 25,381 people in 7,219 households.

References 

"Shot, Iran", Falling Rain Genomics, Inc.
"Shot Map — Satellite Images of Shot", Maplandia

Showt County

Cities in West Azerbaijan Province

Populated places in West Azerbaijan Province

Populated places in Showt County